The terms Old Catholic Church, Old Catholics, Old-Catholic churches or Old Catholic movement designate "any of the groups of Western Christians who believe themselves to maintain in complete loyalty the doctrine and traditions of the undivided church but who separated from the see of Rome after the First Vatican council of 1869–70".

The expression Old Catholic has been used from the 1850s by communions separated from the Roman Catholic Church over certain doctrines, primarily concerned with papal authority and infallibility. Some of these groups, especially in the Netherlands, had already existed long before the term.

These churches are not in full communion with the Holy See. Member churches of the Union of Utrecht of the Old Catholic Churches (UU) are in full communion with the Evangelical Lutheran Church of Sweden and the Anglican Communion; many members of the Union of Utrecht of the Old Catholic Churches hold membership in the World Council of Churches.

Old Catholicism began in the 18th century when members of the See of Utrecht refused to obey papal authority and were excommunicated. Later Catholics who disagreed with the Roman Catholic dogma of papal infallibility as defined by the First Vatican Council (1870) were thereafter without a bishop and joined with the See of Utrecht to form the Union of Utrecht of the Old Catholic Churches (UU). Today, Old Catholic Union of Utrecht churches are found chiefly in Germany, Switzerland, the Netherlands, Austria, Poland and the Czech Republic. The Union of Scranton separated from the Utrechter Union in protest over the UU's ordination of women and LGBT Christians.

Beliefs
Old Catholic theology views the Eucharist as the core of the Christian Church. From that point, the church is a community of believers. All are in communion with one another around the sacrifice of Jesus Christ, as the highest expression of the love of God. Therefore, the celebration of the Eucharist is understood as the experience of Christ's triumph over sin. The defeat of sin consists in bringing together that which is divided.

The 1889  states the Union of Utrecht believes in Vincent of Lérins following quote from his Commonitory: "all possible care must be taken, that we hold that faith which has been believed everywhere, always, by all; for this is truly what is catholic".

History

Pre-Reformation diocese and archdiocese of Utrecht

Post-Reformation Netherlands

The northern provinces, that revolted against the Spanish Netherlands and signed the 1579 Union of Utrecht, persecuted the Roman Catholic Church, confiscated church property, expelled monks and nuns from convents and monasteries, and made it illegal to receive the Catholic sacraments. However, the Catholic Church did not die, rather priests and communities went underground. Groups would meet for the sacraments in the attics of private homes at the risk of arrest. Priests identified themselves by wearing all black clothing with very simple collars.

All the episcopal sees of the area, including that of Utrecht, had fallen vacant by 1580, because the Spanish crown, which since 1559 had patronal rights over all bishoprics in the Netherlands, refused to make appointments for what it saw as heretical territories, and the nomination of an apostolic vicar was seen as a way of avoiding direct violation of the privilege granted to the crown. The appointment of an apostolic vicar, the first after many centuries, for what came to be called the Holland Mission was followed by similar appointments for other Protestant-ruled countries, such as England, which likewise became mission territories. The disarray of the Roman Catholic Church in the Netherlands between 1572 and about 1610 was followed by a period of expansion of Roman Catholicism under the apostolic vicars, leading to Protestant protests.

The initial shortage of Roman Catholic priests in the Netherlands resulted in increased pastoral activity of religious clergy, among whom Jesuits formed a considerable minority, coming to represent between 10 and 15 percent of all the Dutch clergy in the 1600–1650 period. Conflicts arose between these, and the apostolic vicars and secular clergy. In 1629, the priests were 321, 250 secular and 71 religious, with Jesuits at 34 forming almost half of the religious. By the middle of the 17th century the secular priests were 442, the religious 142, of whom 62 were Jesuits.

The fifth apostolic vicar of the Dutch Mission, Petrus Codde, was appointed in 1688. In 1691, the Jesuits accused him of favouring the Jansenist heresy. Pope Innocent XII appointed a commission of cardinals to investigate the accusations against Codde. The commission concluded that the accusations were groundless. In 1702, Pope Clement XI deposed Codde, to which Codde obeyed.

After Codde's resignation, the Diocese of Utrecht elected Cornelius Steenoven as bishop. Following consultation with both canon lawyers and theologians in France and Germany, Dominique Marie Varlet, a Catholic bishop of the French Oratorian Society of Foreign Missions, consecrated Steenoven as a bishop without a papal mandate. What had been de jure autonomous became de facto an independent Catholic church. Steenoven appointed and ordained bishops to the sees of Deventer, Haarlem and Groningen. Although the pope was notified of all proceedings, the Holy See still regarded these dioceses as vacant due to papal permission not being sought. The pope, therefore, continued to appoint apostolic vicars for the Netherlands. Steenoven and the other bishops were excommunicated by the Catholic Church, and thus began the Old Catholic Church in the Netherlands.

While the religious clergy remained loyal to the Holy See, three-quarters of the secular clergy at first followed Codde, but by 1706 over two-thirds of these returned to Roman Catholic allegiance. Of the laity, the overwhelming majority sided with the Holy See. Thus most Dutch Catholics remained in full communion with the pope and with the apostolic vicars appointed by him. However, due to prevailing anti-papal feeling among the powerful Dutch Calvinists, the Church of Utrecht was tolerated and even praised by the government of the Dutch Republic.

The See of Utrecht declared the right to elect its own archbishop in 1724, after being accused of Jansenism. The formation of the Old Catholic communion of Germans, Austrians and Swiss began in 1870 at a public meeting held in Nuremberg under the leadership of Ignaz von Döllinger, following the First Vatican Council.

In 1853 Pope Pius IX received guarantees of religious freedom from King William II of the Netherlands and re-established the Roman Catholic hierarchy in the Netherlands. The Holy See considers the Roman Catholic Archdiocese of Utrecht as the continuation of the episcopal see founded in the 7th century and raised to metropolitan status on 12 May 1559, thus not recognizing any legitimacy of Old Catholics.

First Vatican Council, Old Catholic Union of Utrecht

After the First Vatican Council (1869–1870), several groups of Roman Catholics in Austria-Hungary, Imperial Germany, and Switzerland rejected the Roman Catholic dogma of papal infallibility in matters of faith and morals and left to form their own churches. These were supported by the Old Catholic Archbishop of Utrecht, who ordained priests and bishops for them. Later the Dutch were united more formally with many of these groups under the name "Utrecht Union of Churches".

In the spring of 1871, a convention in Munich attracted several hundred participants, including Church of England and Protestant observers. Döllinger, an excommunicated Roman Catholic priest and church historian, was a notable leader of the movement but was never a member of an Old Catholic Church.

The convention decided to form the "Old Catholic Church" in order to distinguish its members from what they saw as the novel teaching in the Roman Catholic dogma of papal infallibility. Although it had continued to use the Roman Rite, from the middle of the 18th century the Dutch Old Catholic See of Utrecht had increasingly used the vernacular instead of Latin. The churches which broke from the Holy See in 1870 and subsequently entered into union with the Old Catholic See of Utrecht gradually introduced the vernacular into the liturgy until it completely replaced Latin in 1877. In 1874 Old Catholics removed the requirement of clerical celibacy.

The Old Catholic Church within the German Empire received support from the government of Otto von Bismarck, whose 1870s Kulturkampf policies persecuted the Roman Catholic Church. In Austria-Hungary, pan-Germanic nationalist groups, like those of Georg Ritter von Schönerer, promoted the conversion of all German speaking Catholics to Old Catholicism and Lutheranism.

Spread of Old Catholicism throughout the world
In 1913, Mathew consecrated Rudolph de Landas Berghes, who emigrated to the United States in 1914 and planted the seed of Old Catholicism in the Americas. He consecrated an excommunicated Capuchin Franciscan priest as bishop: Carmel Henry Carfora.

Another significant figure, Joseph René Vilatte, who was ordained a deacon and priest by Bishop Eduard Herzog, of the Christian Catholic Church of Switzerland., worked with Catholics of Belgian ancestry living on the Door Peninsula of Wisconsin, with the knowledge and blessing of the Union of Utrecht and under the full jurisdiction of the local Episcopal Bishop of Fond du Lac, Wisconsin.

The Polish National Catholic Church (PNCC) in the U.S. was previously in communion with the Union of Utrecht of Old Catholic Church. In 2003 the church voted itself out of the  because the  accepted the ordination of women and has an open attitude towards homosexuality, both of which the Polish National Catholic Church rejects.

At present, the only recognized group in America that is in communion with the Union of Utrecht is the Episcopal Church.

Old Catholic Church of Slovakia 
The Old Catholic Church of Slovakia was accepted in 2000 as a member of the Union of Utrecht. As early as 2001 some issues arose concerning future consecration of Augustin Bacinsky as old-catholic bishop of Slovakia, and the matter was postponed. Old Catholic Church of Slovakia was expelled from the Union of Utrecht in 2004, because the episcopal administrator Augustin Bacinsky had been consecrated by an episcopus vagans.

Numbers
, there are 115,000 members of Old Catholic churches.

Ecumenism
The Union of Utrecht considers that the reunion of the churches has to be based on a re-actualization of the decisions of faith made by the undivided Church. In that way, they claim, the original unity of the Church could be made visible again. Following these principles, later bishops and theologians of the Union of Utrechts churches stayed in contact with Russian Orthodox, Lutheran and Anglican representatives.

Old Catholic involvement in the multilateral ecumenical movement formally began with the participation of two bishops, from the Netherlands and Switzerland, at the Lausanne Faith and Order (F&O) conference (1927). This side of ecumenism has always remained a major interest for Old Catholics who have never missed an F&O conference. Old Catholics also participate in other activities of the WCC and of national councils of churches. By active participation in the ecumenical movement since its very beginning, the OCC demonstrates its belief in this work.

Apostolic succession
Old Catholicism values apostolic succession by which they mean both the uninterrupted laying on of hands by bishops through time and the continuation of the whole life of the church community by word and sacrament over the years and ages. Old Catholics consider apostolic succession to be the handing on of belief in which the whole Church is involved. In this process the ministry has a special responsibility and task, caring for the continuation in time of the mission of Jesus Christ and his Apostles.

According to the principle of ex opere operato, certain ordinations by bishops not in communion with Rome are still recognised as being valid by the Holy See and the ordinations of and by Old Catholic bishops in the Union of Utrecht churches has never been formally questioned by the Holy See until the more recent ordinations of women as priests.

Liturgy
Christ-Catholic Swiss bishop Urs Küry dismissed the Catholic dogma of transubstantiation because this Scholastic interpretation presumes to explain the Eucharist using the metaphysical concept of "substance". Like the Eastern Orthodox approach to the Eucharist, Old Catholics, he says, ought to accept an unexplainable divine mystery as such and should not cleave to or insist upon a particular theory of the sacrament. Because of this approach, Old Catholics hold an open view to most issues, including the role of women in the Church, the role of married people within ordained ministry, the morality of same sex relationships, the use of conscience when deciding whether to use artificial contraception, and liturgical reforms such as open communion. Its liturgy has not significantly departed from the Tridentine Mass, as is shown in the translation of the German altar book (missal).

In 1994 the German bishops decided to ordain women as priests, and put this into practice on 27 May 1996. Similar decisions and practices followed in Austria, Switzerland and the Netherlands. In 2020, the Swiss church also voted in favour of same-sex marriage. Marriages between two men and two women will be conducted in the same manner as heterosexual marriages. The  allows those who are divorced to have a new marriage in the church. The Old Catholic Church opposes abortion.

An active contributor to the Declaration of the Catholic Congress, Munich, 1871, and all later assemblies for organization was Johann Friedrich von Schulte, the professor of dogma at Prague. Von Schulte summed up the results of the congress as follows:

 adherence to the ancient Catholic faith
 maintenance of the rights of Catholics
 rejection of new Catholic dogmas
 adherence to the constitutions of the ancient Church with repudiation of every dogma of faith not in harmony with the actual consciousness of the Church
 reform of the Church with constitutional participation of the laity
 preparation of the way for reunion of the Christian confessions
 reform of the training and position of the clergy
 adherence to the State against the attacks of Ultramontanism
 rejection of the Society of Jesus
 claim to the real property of the Church

See also

 Ecumenical Catholic Communion

Movements
 Liberal Catholic Movement
 Independent Catholic Churches
 Liberal Catholic Church
 Willibrord Society
 German Catholics (sect)

People
 Franz Heinrich Reusch
 Warren Prall Watters
 Gerard Shelley

Notes

References

Sources

Further reading 
 Episcopi Vagantes and the Anglican Church. Henry R.T. Brandreth. London: Society for Promoting Christian Knowledge, 1947.
 Episcopi vagantes in church history. A.J. Macdonald. London: Society for Promoting Christian Knowledge, 1945.
 The Old Catholic Church: A History and Chronology (The Autocephalous Orthodox Churches, No. 3). Karl Pruter. Highlandville, Missouri: St. Willibrord's Press, 1996.
 The Old Catholic Sourcebook (Garland Reference Library of Social Science). Karl Pruter and J. Gordon Melton. New York: Garland Publishers, 1983.
 The Old Catholic Churches and Anglican Orders. C.B. Moss. The Christian East, January, 1926.
 The Old Catholic Movement. C.B. Moss. London: Society for Promoting Christian Knowledge, 1964.

 "La Sainte Trinité dans la théologie de Dominique Varlet, aux origines du vieux-catholicisme". Serge A. Thériault. Internationale Kirchliche Zeitschrift, Jahr 73, Heft 4 (Okt.-Dez. 1983), p. 234-245.

External links

 
1870 in Christianity
Christian denominations established in the 19th century